Keaon Koloamatangi (born 23 May 1998) is a Tonga international rugby league footballer who plays as a  and  for the South Sydney Rabbitohs in the NRL.

Early life
Koloamatangi grew up in Burwood, New South Wales idolising Sonny Bill Williams and Willie Mason but has been a South Sydney junior since he was a kid thanks to his dad Izzy. Keaon was a Mascot Jets junior & once said "Dad wanted me to play for Mascot because they always won! Instead of putting me in the Canterbury comp he wanted me in the Souths comp because he knew a lot of people, a lot of great players came from there." Keaon attended Ashfield Boys High School, he was an outstanding junior sportsman representing the school in a wide variety of sports and still holds several school swimming records.
Koloamatangi is of Tongan, Tuvalu and Niue descent.

Playing career

2020
Koloamatangi made first grade debut in round 4 of the 2020 NRL season for South Sydney (first grade player number 1157) against the Melbourne Storm.

He made a total of 14 appearances in his first season as the club reached another preliminary final but were defeated by Penrith at ANZ Stadium.

2021
In round 10 of the 2021 NRL season, Koloamatangi scored his first NRL try in South's 32-22 victory over the Cronulla-Sutherland Sharks at Suncorp Stadium.
Midway through the season, Koloamatangi was selected as 20th man in the NSW Blues squad for the first game of the 2021 State of Origin series.
He played a total of 23 games for South Sydney in the 2021 NRL season including the club's 2021 NRL Grand Final defeat against Penrith.

2022
He played 27 games for South Sydney in the 2022 NRL season including all three of the clubs finals matches as they reached the preliminary final for a fifth straight season.  Souths would lose in the preliminary final to eventual premiers Penrith 32-12.

In October he was named in the Tonga squad for the 2021 Rugby League World Cup. In the opening match of Tonga's 2021 Rugby League World Cup campaign, Koloamatangi scored the winning try in Tonga's 24-18 victory over Papua New Guinea.

In November he was named in the 2021 RLWC Team of the Tournament.

References

External links
South Sydney Rabbitohs profile

1998 births
Living people
Australian rugby league players
Australian people of Niuean descent
Australian sportspeople of Tongan descent
Australian people of Tuvaluan descent
Rugby league props
Rugby league players from Sydney
South Sydney Rabbitohs players
Tonga national rugby league team players